Joakim Nyström was the defending champion but did not compete that year.

John McEnroe won in the final 7–6(7–4), 6–2 against Ivan Lendl.

Seeds
A champion seed is indicated in bold text while text in italics indicates the round in which that seed was eliminated.

  John McEnroe (champion)
  Ivan Lendl (final)
  Jimmy Connors (semifinals)
  Johan Kriek (first round)
  Tim Mayotte (quarterfinals)
  Scott Davis (quarterfinals)
  Brad Gilbert (quarterfinals)
  David Pate (third round)
  Greg Holmes (second round)
  Sammy Giammalva, Jr. (first round)
  Jimmy Arias (third round)
  Paul Annacone (quarterfinals)
  Tim Wilkison (third round)
  John Sadri (third round)
  Peter Fleming (third round)
  Mark Dickson (second round)

Draw

Finals

Top half

Section 1

Section 2

Bottom half

Section 3

Section 4

External links
 ATP Singles draw 

Singles